The Carolina Reaper is a cultivar of the Capsicum chinense plant. Developed by American breeder Ed Currie, the pepper is red and gnarled, with a bumpy texture and small pointed tail. In 2017, Guinness World Records declared it the hottest chili pepper in the world.

Pungency

The crossbreed is between a "really nastily hot" La Soufriere pepper from Saint Vincent and a Naga pepper from Pakistan, and was named "Reaper" due to the shape of its tail. It has been described as having a fruity taste, with the initial bite being sweet and then immediately turning to "molten lava". The sensory heat or pungency detected when eating a Carolina Reaper derives from the density of capsaicinoids, particularly capsaicin, which relates directly to the intensity of chili pepper heat and Scoville Heat Units (SHU).

The pepper was bred in a greenhouse in Rock Hill, South Carolina, by Ed Currie, proprietor of the Puckerbutt Pepper Company in Fort Mill. It was certified as the world's hottest chili pepper by Guinness World Records on August 11, 2017, surpassing the previous record set by the Trinidad Scorpion "Butch T". The official Guinness World Record heat level was 1,641,183 SHU in 2017, according to tests conducted by Winthrop University in South Carolina. The figure is an average for the tested batch; the hottest individual pepper was measured at 2.2 million SHU.

In May 2017, breeder Mike Smith of St Asaph, Wales, claimed to have surpassed the Carolina Reaper with his Dragon's Breath pepper, developed by Smith alongside Nottingham Trent University and reported to be 2.4 million SHUs; Smith applied to Guinness World Records for confirmation. Four months later, however, Currie claimed to have bred a stronger pepper known as Pepper X with 3.18 million SHUs.

Cultivation 
For growing, the pepper has been described as "a good all-rounder to try at home" by English ethnobotanist James Wong, who said that they require temperatures of at least  and suggested growing in  pots to restrict growth and produce fruit sooner. When fully ripe, two peppers occupy the palm of the hand.

See also 
 Hottest chili pepper
 Ghost pepper

References

External links 
Ed Currie, Breeding the Carolina Reaper – video on YouTube (17 July 2017)

Chili peppers
Crops originating from the United States
Capsicum cultivars